KFLB-FM and KFLB (branded as Family Life Radio) are radio stations that serves the Midland–Odessa metropolitan area with Christian programming on 88.1 FM and 920 AM. The stations are owned by Family Life Broadcasting.

History

KECK, KBZB and KYXX

KECK went on the air at noon on January 26, 1947. It was owned by Ben Nedow's Ector County Broadcasting Company and broadcast as a daytime-only station with 1,000 watts, adding 500-watt nighttime service in 1950. KECK brought NBC programs to Odessa and was the second new station for the city in as many Sundays (KOSA had gone on the air on January 19). The Nedows owned the station until 1965, three years after Ben's death, when High Sky Broadcasters acquired the frequency. High Sky changed KECK's call letters to KBZB on April 10, 1967.
KBZB was sold in 1968 to the Atkins and Green Broadcasting Company, formed by two Odessa businessmen. Mesa Broadcasting, owned by Randy Wayne of Brownwood, acquired the station in 1976 for $260,000 and relaunched it as KYXX with a country format. KYXX and sister station KKYN in Plainview were sold to Keith Adams and Jim Shelton of Amarillo in 1979. The format flip helped vault KYXX to the top of the Permian Basin radio ratings, where in 1981 it had a market share of 16.5 percent, but in 1982 it was supplanted by KUFO, an FM station.

KENT

In 1986, Adams-Shelton sold KYXX to the Southwest Educational Media Foundation of Texas (SEMFOT), which took control on January 1, 1987. The new ownership, headed by a T. Kent Atkins, changed the call letters to KENT and instituted a middle-of-the-road Christian music format, augmented by syndicated programs from James Dobson, J. Vernon McGee, Warren Wiersbee and others; the station operated noncommercially, seeking support from listeners. Two years later, KENT acquired the construction permit for noncommercial station KOFR at 90.5 MHz, which was owned by Family Radio, and brought it to air as KENT-FM, a simulcast of the AM station.

The signing on of KENT-FM and co-owned FM radio stations in Amarillo and Lubbock, however, would turn into a years-long legal headache for SEMFOT. Three years of investigation turned serious when the Federal Communications Commission asked its administrative law judge to impose the maximum $250,000 fine, citing a record of false information provided to the FCC and saying that KENT-FM, Amarillo's KLMN (now K-LOVE transmitter KXLV) and Lubbock's KAMY (now a Family Life Radio transmitter) were built and operated without FCC authorization. The FCC also designated all SEMFOT stations' licenses for hearing. That April, SEMFOT decided to sell all of its stations to Maranatha Radio for $600,000 in a minority distress sale.

Maranatha sold six stations in Texas and Lake Charles, Louisiana, all former SEMFOT properties, to Family Life Radio in 1998 for $1 million. KENT-AM-FM became KFLB-AM-FM in 2001.

In 2009, Family Life Radio and the Educational Media Foundation engaged in a facility swap in which the original Family Life station, 90.5 FM, was traded to EMF for its 88.1 FM facility, then known as KFRI with the Air 1 network, and $175,000 in cash. On June 19, the KFLB-FM call letters relocated to 88.1 MHz; 90.5 became K-LOVE transmitter KLVW, which had been on EMF's 88.7 frequency.

Translators

KFLB has a translator in Odessa, just outside of the signal contour of KFLB-FM; KFLB-FM has a translator of its own serving Big Spring.

References

External links

FCC History Cards for KECK

FLB
FLB
Radio stations established in 1947
Family Life Radio stations